Arctoseius is a genus of mites in the family Ascidae.

Species

 Arctoseius austriacus Willmann, 1949      
 Arctoseius babenkoi Makarova, 2000      
 Arctoseius cetratus Sellnick, 1940      
 Arctoseius eremita (Berlese, 1918)      
 Arctoseius euventralis Karg, 1998      
 Arctoseius ibericus Willmann, 1949      
 Arctoseius kolymensis Makarova & Petrova, 1992      
 Arctoseius lateroincisus Thor, 1930      
 Arctoseius latoanalis Karg, 1998      
 Arctoseius magnanalis Evans, 1958      
 Arctoseius memnon Halliday, Walter & Lindquist, 1998      
 Arctoseius minutus (Halbert, 1915)      
 Arctoseius miranalis Makarova, 2000      
 Arctoseius nikolskyi Makarova & Petrova, 1992      
 Arctoseius productus Makarova, 2000      
 Arctoseius semiscissus (Berlese, 1892)      
 Arctoseius tajmyricus Petrova & Makarova, 1991      
 Arctoseius tschernovi Makarova, 2000      
 Arctoseius venustulus (Berlese, 1916)

References

Ascidae